Maszków may refer to the following places in Poland:
Maszków, Lower Silesian Voivodeship (south-west Poland)
Maszków, Lesser Poland Voivodeship (south Poland)
Maszków, Lubusz Voivodeship (west Poland)